The Battle of Shevardino took place on 5 September 1812 (24 August = old style), between French and Russian troops, with a victory of the French army.

Prelude
The initial Russian position, which stretched south of the new Smolensk Highway (Napoleon's expected route of advance), was anchored on its left by a pentagonal earthwork redoubt erected on a mound near the village of Shevardino. Kutuzov stated that the fortification was manned simply to delay the advance of the French forces.

Battle
The conflict began on September 5 when Marshal Joachim Murat's French forces met Konovnitzyn's Russians in a massive cavalry clash, the Russians eventually retreating to the Kolorzkoi Cloister when their flank was threatened. Fighting resumed the next day but Konovnitzyn again retreated when Viceroy Eugène de Beauharnais' Fourth Corps arrived, threatening his flank. The Russians withdrew to the Shevardino Redoubt, where a pitched battle ensued. Murat led Nansouty's First Cavalry Corps and Montbrun's Second Cavalry Corps, supported by Compans's Division of Louis Nicolas Davout's First Infantry Corps against the redoubt. Simultaneously, Prince Józef Poniatowski's Polish infantry attacked the position from the south. The French captured the redoubt, at a cost of 4,000  French and 6,000 Russian casualties. The small redoubt was destroyed and covered by the dead and dying of both sides.

Aftermath
The unexpected French advance from the west and the fall of the Shevardino redoubt threw the Russian formation into disarray. Since the left flank of their defensive position had collapsed, Russian forces withdrew to the east, constructing a makeshift position centered around the village of Utitsa. The left flank of the Russian position was thus ripe for a flanking attack. The Battle of Borodino would begin two days later.

See also
List of battles of the French invasion of Russia

Notes

References

External links
 

Battles of the French invasion of Russia
Battles of the Napoleonic Wars
Battles involving France
Battles involving Russia
Conflicts in 1812
August 1812 events
1812 in the Russian Empire